Hot Art: Chasing Thieves and Detectives through the Secret World of Stolen Art is a non-fiction book, written by Canadian writer Joshua Knelman, first published in September 2011 by Douglas & McIntyre. In the book, the author chronicles his four-year investigation into the world of international art theft. Knelman traveled from Cairo to New York City, London, Montreal, and Los Angeles compiling his book; which has been called "A major work of investigative journalism", and "a globetrotting mystery filled with cunning and eccentric characters."

Awards and honours
Hot Art received the 2012 "Arthur Ellis Award" for "Best Crime Nonfiction". The book also received the 2012 "Edna Staebler Award for Creative Non-Fiction".

See also
List of Edna Staebler Award recipients

References

External links
Upper Hudson Library System, Hot Art, Excerpt. Retrieved November 21, 2012

Canadian non-fiction books
2011 non-fiction books
Art crime
Douglas & McIntyre books